California University may refer to:

 California University of Science and Medicine in San Bernardino, California
 Pennsylvania Western University, California (commonly known as PennWest California and formerly known as California University of Pennsylvania) in the Pittsburgh suburb of California, Pennsylvania
 Fictional universities featured in television shows and movies such as Beverly Hills, 90210, Saved by the Bell: The College Years, Legally Blonde, The L Word, We Bare Bears, Grown-ish, Fuller House and Moesha.

The State of California runs two separate 4-year university systems:
 University of California, a public university system in the U.S. state of California
 University of California, Berkeley,  often referred to in the context of college sports as "California" or "Cal"
 "California University Press" is an imprint of the University of California Press
 California State University, a public university system in the U.S. state of California

See also
 California (disambiguation)